Nikolay Vladimirovich Radkevich (c. 1888 – 1916), known as Vadim the Bloodsucker, was a serial killer in the Russian Empire.

Biography 

Radkevich's exact birthplace and date of birth are unknown. By his own admission, he was a cadet of the Arakcheev Cadet Corps in Nizhny Novgorod. At the age of 14, he was tempted by a "depraved woman" who was about 30 years old. After a while she abandoned the young man, but not before she infected him with syphilis. Upon learning this, Radkevich was enraged and tried to kill his former beloved, but did not succeed, as the woman's new lover captured the failed assassin and took him to the station. After a disturbing scandal, Radkevich was expelled from the Cadet Corps.

Radkevich decided that vocation of his whole life was the purification of the world from depraved women. He committed his first murder in June 1909, killing 20-year-old prostitute Anna Blumentrost. In total, Radkevich inflicted 12 stab wounds to her face, neck and shoulders, and then dropped the body in the Neva River. On July 1, the body was found and identified. In St. Petersburg, prostitutes began to panic, and the police began to search for the gory murderer in force.

On July 14, 1909, Radkevich met with a prostitute in Vosstaniya Square, Ekaterina Gerus. He brought her to the "Danube" hotel, which was at that time on Ligovsky Avenue, and ordered the number 9 room on the 3rd floor. At night, Radkevich stabbed Gerus at least 20 times with a knife, but did not kill her this way, and strangled her instead. The next day at 8 AM Radkevich left the room, telling the bellhop to wake her up in an hour. The bellhop soon discovered Gerus' body. Investigators came to the conclusion that both murders were committed by one criminal. On July 24, Radkevich attacked maid Zinaida Levin. With the cry of "Death to beauties!", he began to strike her with his knife, but was frightened by random passers-by, and he fled without completing what had been started. On the following day, Radkevich made another unsuccessful attack on a prostitute in a brothel on Kolomenskaya Street. Most of his casual acquaintances represented Radkevich as Vadim Krovianik, for which he later received his nickname, and perhaps that was why he could not be caught in the early stages. The investigation into the Radkevich case was personally led by the head of the St. Petersburg Detective Police Vladimir Filippov. Radkevich committed his last murder on September 19, 1909. On that day he, according to the scenario of July 14, lured the prostitute Maria Budocnikov to the hotel "Kiao", where he inflicted 35 stab wounds, robbed her and then left a note on the bed:But the bellhop was vigilant, and when he saw Budocnikova's corpse through the keyhole, he made a slight noise. Radkevich tried to resist the bellhop by hitting him with a knife, but hotel employees arrived on time to detain Radkevich.

Trial, sentence and death 
Initially, Radkevich was placed in the psychiatric hospital of St. Nicholas the Wonderworker, which was on the bank of the Pryazhkha River. Psychiatrists' opinions were divided - according to some, he was a sadist, fully responsible for his actions, and according to others - a degenerate with congenital defects in captivity false superidea. On March 10, 1912, a jury trial took place, which sentenced Nikolay Radkevich to eight years in the katorga. In the autumn of 1916 he was killed by fellow inmates while serving his sentence.

See also
 List of Russian serial killers

References 

1880s births
1916 deaths
Male serial killers
Criminals from Saint Petersburg
Serial killers from the Russian Empire
Serial killers murdered in prison custody
People convicted of murder by Russia
Prisoners who died in Russian detention
Crimes against sex workers